John Zwetsloot (born 30 January 1974) is a Swedish guitarist who previously played with black/death metal band Dissection.

Dissection
In 1989, Dissection was looking for a final member to make the band a four-piece group. Mattias Johansson, their current rhythm guitarist was just a session player at the time and wasn't dedicated to the band. They found Zwetsloot and Dissection was formed, then later went to play their first show in 1991.

Zwetsloot brought a unique flavor to the band with his knowledge in classical music and theory helped the band form many of its dual harmonies. He was the rhythm guitarist while Nödtveidt played the harmonies as the lead guitarist. He came to be the main composer for most of the songs on the album, behind Nödtveidt. He also brought his knowledge and technique of classical guitar to the table, composing three short solo tracks and interludes for the songs.

His solos compositions for the band include: "Crimson Towers," "Into Infinite Obscurity," and "Feathers Fell." The latter two have had various arrangements featured on other Dissection albums. The end of "Heaven's Damnation" contains a brief classical arrangement of the song's main melody, this is also composed and played by him.

When the band played live shows, or rehearsed to work on the new album, Zwetsloot showed up late or skipped meetings altogether. He caused the band to cancel gigs because of his absence. Due to him not taking the band as seriously as the other members did, they all decided it would be appropriate for Zwetsloot to leave the band. In 1994 he was replaced by Johan Norman.

Though he wasn't a part of Dissection for their second album, Storm of the Light's Bane, he shares writing credits on two of the songs. Nödtveidt and Norman became the primary songwriters for the band after Zwetsloot's departure.

After Dissection
Having left Dissection after The Somberlain, he played for Nifelheim from 1994 to 1998.

He also started his own band Cardinal Sin in 1995. In typical Zwetsloot fashion, he composed a Classical piece for Cardinal Sin's only EP. The band split in 1996, but returned for sometime in 2003.

Zwetsloot was the original lead guitarist of the band The Haunted from Aug-Sept 1996.

Zwetsloot as John John on guitar was also in the Norwegian band Fuck You All from 2002 to 2009.

Discography

With Dissection

Studio releases

The Somberlain - (1993)
Storm of the Light's Bane - (1995)

Demos and bootlegs

The Grief Prophecy - (1990) - Demo
Into Infinite Obscurity - (1991) - 7-inch EP
Untitled - (1992) - Demo

With Cardinal Sin

Studio releases

Spiteful Intent - (1996) - EP

Demos and bootlegs

Promo - (1995) - Demo

Notes

Swedish male musicians
Black metal musicians
1974 births
Living people
Dissection (band) members